Thomas Gaughan Carmody Jr. (born April 20, 1961), is an American real estate broker and former politician from Shreveport, Louisiana who served as a member of the Louisiana House of Representatives for the 6th district from 2008 to 2020.

Early life and education

Carmody is one of thirteen children, eleven still living as of 2018, of Thomas Gaughan Carmody Sr. (1932–2012), and the former Katherine Phelan (born November 19, 1932).

In 1979, Carmody graduated from the Roman Catholic Jesuit High School in Shreveport, now Loyola College Prep. In 1983, Carmody received the Bachelor of Fine Arts degree from Louisiana State University in Baton Rouge.

Career

Louisiana House of Representatives

Carmody served as Chairman of House Commerce Committee, having previously served on Commerce, Education, and the Municipal, Parochial, and Cultural Affairs committees. Carmody's biggest donors in his initial election were the Republican Party, the Louisiana Association of Educators, and the Louisiana Hospital Association.

References

1961 births
Living people
Politicians from Shreveport, Louisiana
Republican Party members of the Louisiana House of Representatives
Louisiana city council members
Businesspeople from Louisiana
American real estate businesspeople
Louisiana State University alumni
21st-century American politicians